Pierre Hastert (9 September 1912 – 23 April 1972) was a Luxembourgian swimmer. He competed in the men's 4 × 200 metre freestyle relay at the 1936 Summer Olympics.

References

1912 births
1972 deaths
Luxembourgian male freestyle swimmers
Olympic swimmers of Luxembourg
Swimmers at the 1936 Summer Olympics
Sportspeople from Luxembourg City